Amaurosis congenita, cone-rod type, with congenital hypertrichosis is a very rare genetic disorder which is characterized by ocular anomalies and trichomegaly. It is inherited in an autosomal recessive manner. Only 2 cases have been described in medical literature.

Signs and symptoms 

This is a list of the symptoms that this condition causes:

 Cone-rod type amaurosis congenita
 Severe corneal dystrophy
 Vision impairment
 Severe photophobia which isn't associated to nyctalopia
 Thick eyebrows
 Synophrys
 Hypertrichosis
 Hypermetropia
 Hirsutism

Etimology 

It has been described in 2 cousins born to consanguineous parents, both of them had the same symptoms.

References 

Diseases and disorders
Genetic diseases and disorders
Medical genetics